Zabo may refer to:

Zabo, Burkina Faso
Zerzabelshof (de), locally usually abbreviated to Zabo, a district in the German city of Nuremberg
Calvin Zabo, the alter ego of Marvel Comics character Mister Hyde